Jordan Gross (born May 9, 1995) is an American professional ice hockey defenseman who is currently playing for the  Nashville Predators of the National Hockey League (NHL).

Playing career

Amateur
Gross played school hockey in Minnesota with Maple Grove High School before playing junior in the United States Hockey League (USHL) with the Green Bay Gamblers. Undrafted, Gross committed to collegiate hockey with the University of Notre Dame, beginning as a freshman in the 2014–15 season.

In his senior season with the Fighting Irish and although under-sized Gross developed into one of the top defenseman in the NCAA. In the 2017–18 season, Gross registered 10 goals and 30 points in 40 games, ranking third on Notre Dame in scoring and led all Fighting Irish defensemen in points. Gross helped the Fighting Irish advance to the Frozen Four championship game where he was named to the NCAA (Championship) All-Tournament Team and later the Big Ten Conference First All-Star Team.

Professional

Arizona Coyotes
As a free agent, Gross attracted NHL interest, opting to sign a two-year, entry-level contract with the Arizona Coyotes on April 12, 2018. He immediately joined the Coyotes' AHL affiliate, the Tucson Roadrunners, on an amateur try-out, making his professional debut in a solitary appearance and registering 2 assists to end the regular season, in a 6-3 victory over the San Diego Gulls on April 14, 2018.

In the following  season, Gross was assigned to continue his development with the Roadrunners in the AHL, before he was recalled by the Coyotes on December 22, 2019, and made his NHL debut for the Coyotes against the Detroit Red Wings and scored his first NHL point with an assist on the Coyotes' fifth goal. Returning to the Roadrunners following two games, Gross tied for first among Tucson defensemen with 10 goals and finished second with 27 points while appearing in 56 contests.

On October 10, 2020, as a restricted free agent, Gross was signed to a one-year, two-way contract extension with the Arizona Coyotes. In the pandemic delayed  season, Gross spent the majority of the season on the Coyotes extended taxi squad. On April 2, 2021, Gross registered a career-high 3 assists against the Anaheim Ducks, the most tallied by a Coyotes rookie defenseman in a single game since Keith Ballard in 2006. Gross finished with 3 points through 7 games before missing the final 14 games of the shortened season due to a lower body injury.

Colorado Avalanche
As a free agent from the Coyotes, due to lack of games played at the NHL level, Gross was signed to a one-year, two-way contract with the Colorado Avalanche for the  season on July 31, 2021. Assigned to AHL affiliate, the Colorado Eagles following training camp with the Avalanche, Gross was a staple on the blueline, leading all defenseman and tied for the team lead in scoring with 18 points through 21 games before earning his first recall to the Avalanche on December 15, 2021. He made his Avalanche debut the following day, taking two minor penalties in a 5-2 defeat to the Nashville Predators. He was returned to the Eagles following the game, as the Avalanche took a hiatus due to COVID-19. In continuing his break out season with the Eagles, Gross finished the regular season leading the league in scoring on the blueline with 10 goals and 55 assists for 65 points over 61 games, earning selection to the AHL's First All-Star Team. He was awarded the Eddie Shore Award in recognition of his season as the AHL's outstanding defenseman.

Nashville Predators
As a free agent from the Avalanche, Gross capitalised on his successful season by agreeing to a two-year, $1.525 million contract with the Nashville Predators on July 13, 2022.

Career statistics

Awards and honors

References

External links

1995 births
Living people
American men's ice hockey defensemen
Arizona Coyotes players
Colorado Avalanche players
Colorado Eagles players
Green Bay Gamblers players
Milwaukee Admirals players
Ice hockey players from Minnesota
Nashville Predators players
Notre Dame Fighting Irish men's ice hockey players
Tucson Roadrunners players
Undrafted National Hockey League players